Ziziphus quadrilocularis is a flowering plant endemic to Australia.  Its name in the indigenous Wardaman language is Mardarrgu.

Description
It is a deciduous, spiny shrub or tree, growing  to 2–12 m in height.  It bears green and yellow flowers from November to March.  It has a life span of over 20 years, producing its first seeds at an age of 6–10 years.  After being scorched by wildfire it can resprout from a lignotuber and root suckers.

Distribution and habitat
Its range is limited to northern Australia where it occurs in the Kimberley region of Western Australia and adjacent areas of the Northern Territory.  It is found on basalt and sandstone derived soils along watercourses, hillsides and scree slopes.

Uses
The fruit is edible.

References

Notes

Sources
 
 
 

quadrilocularis
Endemic flora of Australia
Rosales of Australia
Rosids of Western Australia
Flora of the Northern Territory
Taxa named by Ferdinand von Mueller
Plants described in 1862